Chi Alpha Sigma is an Honor Society for student-athletes that began at the DePauw University in 1994. Kellen Wells-Mangold serves as the Executive Director.

History
Chi Alpha Sigma was founded on May 17, 1996 at DePauw University by Nick Mourouzis, DePauw head football coach and professor of kinesiology.

On  Chi Alpha Sigma announced a partnership with the Beyond the Game Network (BTG) to provide additional mentorship and career advice for inductees of the National College Athlete Honor Society.

As of  Chi Alpha Sigma had inducted 317 chapters.

Membership requirements
Membership requirements for Chi Alpha Sigma are:
 A student-athlete must attend a four-year accredited college or university that is an NCAA or NAIA member, 
 Achieve junior status, 
 Hold a minimum 3.4 GPA
 Have an endorsement from their head coach and be of good moral character.

(Student-athletes who compete for a collegiate club team are also eligible if the club team is overseen by the athletics department at the local chapter)

References

Honor societies
Student organizations established in 1996
1996 establishments in Indiana